Klütz is a town in the Nordwestmecklenburg district, in Mecklenburg-Western Pomerania, Germany. It is situated near the Baltic Sea coast, 22 km northwest of Wismar, and 33 km northeast of Lübeck. It is famous for the manor house Bothmer Castle, located just outside the village. In the centre of the village lies the medieval Brick Gothic village church, dedicated to Our Lady. There is also a centre of literature named after writer Uwe Johnson in the town.

It is close to the cities of Lübeck, Wismar and Schwerin and is part of the Hamburg Metropolitan Region.

Notable residents
 Fedor Kelling (1820-1909), New Zealand politician
 Carl Friederich Christian Kelling (1818-1898), New Zealand politician

References

External links
 
 Schloss Bothmer (manor house) website (German)

Cities and towns in Mecklenburg
Nordwestmecklenburg
Populated places established in 1938